Geodia hentscheli is a species of sponge in the family Geodiidae. It is found in the waters of the North Atlantic Ocean. The species was  described in 2010 by Paco Cárdenas, Hans Tore Rapp, Christoffer Schander & Ole S. Tendal.

References 

Tetractinellida
Animals described in 2010